Luchuena is a genus of air-breathing land snails, terrestrial pulmonate gastropod mollusks in the family Enidae.

Species
Species within the genus Luchuena include:
 Luchuena hachijoensis

References

Enidae
Taxonomy articles created by Polbot